This article contains the results of the Republic of Ireland national football team during the 1960s and 1970s.

1960

1961

1962

1963

1964

1965

1966

1967

1968

1969

1970

1971

1972

1973

1974

1975

1976

1977

1978

1979

See also
 Republic of Ireland national football team results (1954–1959
 Republic of Ireland national football team - 1980s Results

References

Notes

1960–1979
1959–60 in Republic of Ireland association football
1960–61 in Republic of Ireland association football
1961–62 in Republic of Ireland association football
1962–63 in Republic of Ireland association football
1963–64 in Republic of Ireland association football
1964–65 in Republic of Ireland association football
1965–66 in Republic of Ireland association football
1966–67 in Republic of Ireland association football
1967–68 in Republic of Ireland association football
1968–69 in Republic of Ireland association football
1969–70 in Republic of Ireland association football
1970–71 in Republic of Ireland association football
1971–72 in Republic of Ireland association football
1972–73 in Republic of Ireland association football
1973–74 in Republic of Ireland association football
1974–75 in Republic of Ireland association football
1975–76 in Republic of Ireland association football
1976–77 in Republic of Ireland association football
1977–78 in Republic of Ireland association football
1978–79 in Republic of Ireland association football
1979–80 in Republic of Ireland association football